Tysk Hudindustri (Danish for "German Flesh Industry") is the third studio album from the Danish heavy metal band Red Warszawa.
The album has the under-title "Greatest Hits 1986-2000 Volume 3".

Track listing
 Heavy for dig (Heavy for you)
 Amok
 KKK-Salat (KKK-Salad)
 Pludselig Får Du Et Cirkelspark Af Folk Du Ikke Kender (Suddenly you get roundhouse kicked by people you don't know)
 Der Vil Altid Være en Straf (There will always be a punishment)
 Tråkker (Trucker - but intentionally misspelled with a Danish 'å')
 Bilerne ud af Byen (The cars out of town)
 Tror Du det er For Sjov Jeg Drikker (Do you think I drink for fun)
 EPO-Sangen (The EPO-song)
 Æggemad (Egg-sandwich)
 Brun (Brown)
 Wie Dumm Kann Mann Sein (German for 'How stupid can you be')
 Prost (German for 'Cheers')
 Narko og Porno (Drugs and Porn)
 Beige
 Hesteviskeren (The Horse Whisperer)
 Svensk/Finsk Løsning (Swedish/Finnish Solution)
 Messermann (German for 'Knife Man')
Bonus track: BBBMPVHNK

Cover
Cover

Sources 
http://www.rw.dk/

2000 albums
Red Warszawa albums